Ho-203 was a Japanese autocannon that saw considerable use during World War II. It was a long-recoil automation of the Year 11 Type direct-fire infantry gun. It was fed by a 15-round closed-loop ammunition belt.  It was operationally used only as the nose gun of the Kawasaki Ki-45-KAI heavy fighter, the anti-bomber workhorse of the Imperial Japanese Army, and tried out in the upper fuselage of the III-KAI variant of the Mitsubishi Ki-46 Dinah twin-engined warplane as a Japanese form of the Nazi Luftwaffes Schräge Musik upwards-aimed armament system for heavy fighters.

Specifications
Caliber: 37 mm (1.45 in)
Ammunition: 37 x 112R (475 g)
Weight: 89 kg (196 lb)
Rate of fire: 120 rounds/min
Muzzle velocity: 570 m/s (1,870 ft/s)
Effective range: 900 m (2,950 ft).

Similar ordnance designs
 37mm Bordkanone BK 3,7 (Nazi Germany)

See also
Ho-5 cannon
MK 108 cannon
Ho-155 cannon
Ho-204 cannon
Ho-301 cannon
Ho-401 cannon

References

37 mm artillery
Autocannon
Aircraft guns